Sengathu Bhoomiyilae is a 2012 Indian Tamil-language film directed by  M. Rathnakumar for producer Revathi Duraimurugan. The film released on 3 February 2012 to generally mixed reviews.

Plot

Sengathu Bhoomiyilae is the story of two closely related families, falling apart due to an unfortunate incident.  It creates more issues widening the rift which snowballs into bigger and ends up in the loss of many lives that breaks the relationships.  As they bay for each other's blood like sworn enemies, some innocent minds are affected by the rift and vengeance creating disastrous result for everyone.

Cast

Pawan as Vallarasu
Mirchi Senthil as Chinnasamy
Priyanka Nair as Vairasilai
Sunu Lakshmi as Jayakodi
Singampuli as Ondippuli
Vellai Pandi as Santhai Mayi
Azhagan Thamizhmani as Malaichami
Stalin as Bose
Nivas
Varun
Vishnu Priya

Soundtrack
Soundtrack was composed by Ilaiyaraaja, while lyrics written by Ilaiyaraaja (En Usuru) and Snehan.
"Sikkikichu Sikkikichu" - Sunitha Rao, Prasanna
"Oram Po Oram Po" - Priyadarshini, Sunitha Rao, V. V. Prasanna, Raagul
"Kaathiruppen Kaathiruppen" - Rita
"En Usuru Ennai Vittu" - Rita
"Thiru Vizha Song" - Saravana Devi, Sakthivel Dindugul

Reception
Upon release, Sengathu Bhoomiyilae received generally mixed reviews.  Behindwoods gave the film 1.5 out of 5, stating that the "film that tries to rework the rural revenge formula with a load of stereotypes, but it looks below par" The Hindu mentioned as " for a movie written by the same person who wrote Karuththamma and Kizhakku Cheemayile, Sengathu Bhoomiyilaehas surprisingly with insipid dialogues and the actors were made do with a boxful of clichés, thus ends up diluting all characters". While moviepettai.com praised the film mentioning as " The director has tried to do justice to his job. Another film into your weekend entertainment kitty". while Deccan Chronicle gave the film 3 out of 5, mentioning "The director was able to convey the message effectively with interesting twists and turns despite a lesser-known cast. A well-made film, worth a watch!".

References

External links
 

2012 films
Films scored by Ilaiyaraaja
2010s Tamil-language films